Batson Branch is a  long 2nd order tributary to Dirickson Creek, in Sussex County, Delaware.

Variant names
According to the Geographic Names Information System, it has also been known historically as:  
Roxana Branch

Course
Batson Branch rises on the Agricultural Ditch divide about 0.25 miles northeast of Roxana in Sussex County, Delaware.  Batson Branch then flows southeast to meet Dirickson Creek about 0.1 miles north of Johnson, Delaware.

Watershed
Batson Branch drains  of area, receives about 44.7 in/year of precipitation, has a topographic wetness index of 630.22 and is about 8.2% forested.

See also
List of rivers of Delaware

References

Rivers of Delaware